Transmarisca Bay (‘Zaliv Transmarisca’ \'za-liv trans-ma-'ri-ska\) is the 4.3 km wide bay indenting for 3.2 km the north coast of Krogh Island in Biscoe Islands, Antarctica.  It is entered east of Edholm Point and west of Kuvikal Point.

The bay is named after the ancient Roman town of Transmarisca in Northeastern Bulgaria.

Location
British mapping in 1976.

Maps
 British Antarctic Territory.  Scale 1:200000 topographic map.  DOS 610 Series, Sheet W 66 66.  Directorate of Overseas Surveys, UK, 1976.
 Antarctic Digital Database (ADD). Scale 1:250000 topographic map of Antarctica. Scientific Committee on Antarctic Research (SCAR). Since 1993, regularly upgraded and updated.

References
 Bulgarian Antarctic Gazetteer. Antarctic Place-names Commission. (details in Bulgarian, basic data in English)
 Transmarisca Bay. SCAR Composite Antarctic Gazetteer.

External links
 Transmarisca Bay. Copernix satellite image

Bays of Graham Land
Landforms of the Biscoe Islands
Bulgaria and the Antarctic